The BMW Ladies Championship is a women's professional golf tournament in Wonju, South Korea, co-sanctioned by the LPGA of Korea Tour and the LPGA Tour. It debuted in 2019. It replaced the LPGA KEB Hana Bank Championship as the LPGA Tour's Korean stop on its Asian swing.

It is a 72-hole event with a limited field of 84 players, approximately half of a full-field event. There is no cut; all players play all four rounds.

Jang Ha-na won the inaugural event in a playoff over Danielle Kang.

An LPGA of Korea Tour event of the same name was played from 2015 to 2017 at the Sky 72 Golf Club, home of the LPGA KEB Hana Bank Championship.

Winners

Tournament record
As LPGA Tour event

References

External links

Coverage on LPGA official site

LPGA Tour events
LPGA of Korea Tour events
Golf tournaments in South Korea
Autumn events in South Korea
Recurring sporting events established in 2019
2019 establishments in South Korea